Always (lit. Only You) is a 2011 South Korean drama film directed by Song Il-gon. Starring So Ji-sub and Han Hyo-joo in the lead roles, it is about a romance between an ex-boxer who has closed his heart to the world and a telemarketer who remains spirited despite slowly going blind.

It was released in theaters on October 20, 2011. In South Korea, the film had a total of 1,027,614 admissions nationwide. With online tickets selling out a 2,000-seat outdoor movie theater in a record seven seconds, Always was the opening film of the 2011 Busan International Film Festival.

Cast

 So Ji-sub as Jang Cheol-min / Jang Marcelino
 Han Hyo-joo as Ha Jung-hwa
 Yun Jong-hwa as Min Tae-sik
 Kang Shin-il as Choi (boxing gym manager)
 Park Chul-min as Coach Bang
 Jo Sung-ha as section chief Choi
 Jin Goo as pottery store owner
 Oh Kwang-rok as Park Chang-soo (man wanted by loan sharks)
 Shin Cheol-jin as Elder in rehab	
 Kim Jeong-hak as team leader Ma
 Kim Mi-kyung as Sister Joanna
 Wie Seung-bae as martial arts champion
 Jung Jae-jin as shift old man
 Min Kyeong-jin as janitor
 Yeom Hye-ran as beauty parlor owner
 Ahn Se-ho as broker
 Choi Gyo-sik as real estate agent

Remake

The film was officially remade in 2014 in Turkish as Sadece Sen. It has also been remade in Kannada in 2015 as Boxer and in Hindi in 2016 as Do Lafzon Ki Kahani. A Japanese remake, titled Your Eyes Tell (きみの瞳が問いかけている, Kimi no Me ga Toikaketeiru), starring Ryusei Yokohama and Yuriko Yoshitaka, was released on October 23, 2020. A Filipino remake, titled Always, starring Kim Chiu and Xian Lim was released on September 28, 2022.

References

External links
 
 
 

2011 films
South Korean romantic drama films
Films about blind people
2011 romantic drama films
Showbox films
South Korean films remade in other languages
2010s South Korean films